Leroy Kwadijk (born 3 August 1983) is a former Dutch darts player who plays in Professional Darts Corporation events. Leroy Kwadijk has Career Earnings of £6,142.

Career

Kwadijk made his PDC debut in the 2007 Thialf Darts Trophy, reaching the semi finals. He defeated Denis Ovens, Ray Farrell and James Wade before losing to eventual winner Roland Scholten. He then reached the last 32 of the 2007 PDC German Darts Championship, beating Peter Manley in the first round and then beat Jamie Caven before losing to Mark Walsh.

Kwadijk played in the 2008 PDC World Darts Championship, losing in the first round to Andy Hamilton. Since then though, he has been unable to maintain his form. Having played in nine ranked PDC events, he only managed to win £225. He also suffered a first round exit from the 2008 PDC German Darts Championship.

World Championship Results

PDC

2008: 1st Round (lost to Andy Hamilton 1-3)

References

External links
Profile and stats on Darts Database

1983 births
Living people
Dutch darts players
Professional Darts Corporation associate players
Sportspeople from Zaanstad